Alfonso d'Este (21 July 1476 – 31 October 1534) was Duke of Ferrara during the time of the War of the League of Cambrai.

Biography

He was the son of Ercole I d'Este, Duke of Ferrara and Eleanor of Naples and became duke on Ercole's death in January 1505.
In the first year of his rule he uncovered a plot by his brother Ferrante and half-brother Giulio d'Este, directed against him and his other brother Ippolito. In September 1506 a trial for lèse majesté and high treason was held and, as expected, the death sentence was passed, but just as Ferrante and Giulio were about to mount the gallows they were informed that the duke had commuted their sentence to life imprisonment. They were led away to two cells in the Torre dei Leoni. Ferrante died in his cell after 34 years of imprisonment, while Giulio held on until he was pardoned in 1559, after 53 years of imprisonment.  After his release, Giulio was ridiculed in the streets of Ferrara for his outdated clothes and died in 1561.

In the Italian Wars Alfonso preserved his precarious position among the contending powers by flexibility and vigilance and the unrivalled fortifications of Ferrara; he entered the League of Cambrai against Venice and remained an ally of Louis XII of France even after Pope Julius II had made peace with Venice; when the Bolognesi rebelled against Julius and toppled Michelangelo's bronze statue of the Pope from above the gate, Alfonso received the shards and recast them as a cannon named La Giulia, which he set on the ramparts of the castello: in 1510 Julius excommunicated him and declared his fiefs forfeit, thereby adding Ferrara to the Papal States; Alfonso then fought successfully against the Venetian and Papal armies, winning the Battle of Polesella, capturing Bologna, and playing a major part in the French victory at the Battle of Ravenna (1512). These successes were based on Ferrara's artillery, produced in his own foundry, which was the best of its time. In both of his portraits by Titian, (Compare illustration above) he poses with his arm across the mouth of one of his cannon.

In 1526–1527 Alfonso participated in the expedition of Charles V, Holy Roman Emperor and king of Spain, against Pope Clement VII, and in 1530 the pope again recognized him as possessor of the forfeited duchies of Modena and Reggio.

Marriages

In January 1491, Alfonso was married to Anna Maria Sforza, the niece of Ludovico Sforza, Duke of Milan. In the same ceremony, Ludovico was married to Alfonso's younger sister, Beatrice d'Este, in a double wedding orchestrated by Leonardo da Vinci.

Politically, the wedding was designed to cement ties between the two families. Anna Sforza's death, on 30 November 1497, marked the end of those ties, as Beatrice d'Este had died in January of that same year.

Alfonso later remarried, to Lucrezia Borgia, in 1502.

After Lucrezia's death on 24 June 1519, he married Laura Dianti by whom he had had an illegitimate son, Alfonso d'Este (later legitimized).

Art

Like his brother Ippolito I, Cardinal d'Este, he was one of the great patrons of art of his time: for him the elderly Giovanni Bellini painted The Feast of the Gods in 1514, Bellini's last completed painting. He turned to Bellini's pupil, Titian, for a sequence of paintings. In 1529 Alfonso created the most magnificent gallery of his time,  his studiolo or camerino d'alabastro ("small alabaster room"), now usually known as his "Camerino", in order to better display his works of art against white marble-veneered walls under a gilded ceiling. The pallor of the marble led to the name of this room as the chamber of alabaster. There are documents from Mario Equicola on 9 October 1511, noting plans for painting of a room in Ferrara, in which six fables (fabule) or histories (istorie) shall be placed. I have already found them and have presented them in writing." A letter from Alfonso, dated 14 November 1514, authorized payment to Giovanni Bellini, the first painting completed for the chamber.

Titian is known to have painted two portraits of Alfonso: the first was widely acclaimed, singled out by Michelangelo and coerced as a diplomatic gift by Charles V, Holy Roman Emperor; Alfonso induced Titian to paint a free replica, which the artist of the painting illustrated above has adapted for his model. Over the next two decades, Titian added three more paintings: The Worship of Venus (Museo del Prado, Madrid), The Bacchanal of the Andrians (Prado, Madrid), and Bacchus and Ariadne (National Gallery, London). Dosso Dossi produced another large bacchanal, and he also contributed ceiling decorations and a painted frieze for the cornice, depicting scenes from the Aeneid, which gained immediacy by showing the heroes in contemporary dress  (illustration, left). All the bacchanals in the Alabaster Chamber dealt with love, and some refer to marriage. After the Este family lost control of Ferrara in 1598, the Alabaster Chamber's paintings and sculpture were dispersed.

Alfonso inherited from Cardinal d'Este the poet Ariosto. Following in the lead of his father Ercole, who had made Ferrara into one of the musical centers of Europe, Alfonso brought some of the most famous musicians of the time to his court to work as composers, instrumentalists and singers.  Musicians from northern Europe who worked at Ferrara during his reign included Antoine Brumel and Adrian Willaert, the latter of whom was to become the founder of the Venetian School, something which could not have happened without Alfonso's patronage.

History
When Alfonso's grandson Alfonso II d'Este—Robert Browning's duke of "My Last Duchess"—produced no male heir, the main d'Este line died out. A grandson of Alfonso I and cousin of Alfonso II, Cesare d'Este had been born out of wedlock. He was recognized by the Emperor but not by the Pope, who took the Duchy of Ferrara by force. Nevertheless, the House of Este continued in Modena and Reggio.

Ancestors

See also
House of Este
Italian Wars

References

Bibliography
 Taylor, Frederick Lewis (1973). The Art of War in Italy, 1494–1529. Westport: Greenwood Press. .

External links

Dosso Dossi: Court Painter in Renaissance Ferrara, a full text exhibition catalog from The Metropolitan Museum of Art
"Alfonso d'Este, Duke of Ferrara"
"Reconstructing the Duke's private gallery"

1476 births
1534 deaths
Alfonso 1
Alfonso 1
Alfonso 1
Alfonso 1
Foundrymen
Military leaders of the Italian Wars
People excommunicated by the Catholic Church
15th-century Italian nobility
16th-century Italian nobility
Burials at the Corpus Domini Monastery, Ferrara